Shadegan (also Romanized as Shādegān, locally known as Goru (گورو) or Gowrū) is a village in Kuh Mareh Khami Rural District, in the Central District of Basht County, Kohgiluyeh and Boyer-Ahmad Province, Iran. At the 2006 census, its population was 26, in 8 families.

Gallery

References

External links

Populated places in Basht County